For the main article see Bavarian ice hockey leagues

The Bavarian ice hockey league season 2007-08 started on 19 October 2007 with the first round in the Bayernliga and finished on 14 March 2008 with the third league final. It saw the EHC Waldkraiburg take out its second Bavarian title, having previously won it in 1987–88, then under the name of VfL Waldkraiburg. The club could have taken up promotion to the Oberliga but declined. The EV Weiden voluntarily withdrew from the Oberliga while Regensburg was forced to resign from the 2nd Bundesliga due to insolvency.

The Bayernliga season saw the EC Ulm/Neu-Ulm fold after 16 rounds, unable to complete its schedule.

No team remained unbeaten this season, the ESC Kempten in the Bezirksliga West held the best record with 19 wins and one defeat. Two teams, both from the Bezirksliga, remained winless all season, the SG München and the TSV Trostberg II. For the later, it was the second winless season in a row, having only ever won one game since joining the league in 2005.

Champions
The three levels of the Bavarian league system were won by the following teams:

 Bayernliga: EHC Waldkraiburg
 Landesliga: ESV Buchloe
 Bezirksliga: SC Gaißach

Bayernliga
 The competition was played, as in the years previously, with 16 teams, with the top eight qualified for the championship play-off and the bottom eight having to play-down to determine the two relegated teams.

Final table

 The EC Ulm/Neu Ulm folded in December 2007 for financial reasons, all games after this decision were counted as 0-5 losses for the club.
 (N) denotes team promoted from the Landesliga after the previous season.

Play-Offs
The first round of the play-offs was carried out in a best-of-five modus, after that it went to a best-of-three. The winner of the final is crowned Bayrischer Meister (English:Bavarian champions).

First round

Semi finals

Finals
 Third place:

 Championship:

 The EHC Waldkraiburg wins the Bavarian championship for the 2007–08 season.

Play-Downs
The first round of the play-offs was carried out in a best-of-five modus, after that it went to a best-of-three. The EC Ulm/Neu-Ulm did not play any games, all games awarded to the opposition. The two teams in the final are relegated to the Landesligas.

First round

Semi finals

Final

Series not played, the EV Fürstenfeldbruck is relegated, the EC Ulm/Neu Ulm  has folded.

Top scorers

Main round

Play-Offs

Landesliga 
The four regional divisions played out a home-and-away round to determined the two clubs from each league who enter the eight team promotion round, The top two teams of this round gain promotion to the Bayernliga. Should one or more teams from this league move up to the Oberliga without a Bavarian team being relegated from there, additional clubs from that round may gain promotion.

The remaining six clubs in each league played out a relegation round with the last team in each of the four groups being relegated to the Bezirksliga.

From season to season, clubs can be moved between divisions to geographically balance out promotion and relegation. This explains, why three of the Landesligas have two newly promoted teams each while the western division has none in the 2007–08 season. The fact that six clubs moved up from the Bezirksliga to the Landesliga from the previous season results from the fact that four teams were promoted to the Bayernliga the previous season and therefore extra places were available to fill.

First round
Top two teams enter the promotion round.
 Landesliga Nord

 Landesliga Süd

 Landesliga Ost

 Landesliga West

 (R) denotes team relegated from the Bayernliga after previous season.
 (N) denotes team promoted from the Bezirksliga after previous season.

Promotion round
Top two teams promoted to the Bayernliga.

 The ESV Buchloe is the 2007-08 Bavarian Landesliga champion.

Relegation round
No points were taken along from the first rounds competition. The bottom team in each group is relegated to the Bezirksliga, except the EK München, which was not.
 Landesliga Nord

 The game EV Pegnitz versus ERSC Amberg on 24 February 2008 was not played.
 Landesliga Süd

 Landesliga Ost

 Landesliga West

Bezirksliga
The four regional division played out a home-and-away round to determined the league winner. The four league champions are promoted to the Landesliga and also are qualified for the Bezirksliga championship round.

Main round
First placed team enters championship round and is promoted to Landesliga. In addition, EHC Regensburg is promoted as best runner-up, taking the spot of the folded EC Ulm/Neu Ulm.

 Bezirksliga Nord

 Bezirksliga Süd

 Bezirksliga Ost

 Bezirksliga West

 (R) denotes team relegated from the Landesliga after previous season.
 (N) denotes team has newly entered the league system:
 ESC Kempten is a new club, took over ice hockey department of TSV Kottern.
 EHF Passau II and ESV Buchloe II are newly entered reserve teams.
 SG München is actually the third team of EHC München.

Championship round
The Bezirksliga championship was decided in a home-and-away round with the club with the best aggregate score taking out the series. All four teams are already promoted to the Landesliga.

Semi finals

Finals
 Third place:

 Championship:

 The SC Gaißach is the 2007-08 Bavarian Bezirksliga champion.

Sources 
 Bayrischer Eissport Verband- Official Bavarian ice hockey website
 Hockey Archives - International ice hockey website with tables and results (in French)
 Bayernhockey-Inoffical website on Bavarian ice hockey

2007
2007–08 in German ice hockey